CUPL may refer to:
China University of Political Science and Law, Beijing, China
Cornell University Programming Language
Compiler for Universal Programmable Logic, Programmable Array Logic (a proprietary language from Logical Devices, Inc.)